The Mingan shrew rat (Rhynchomys mingan) is a species of shrewlike rat in the subfamily Murinae. It was discovered at elevations above 1450 m on Mt. Mingan of the central Sierra Madre of Luzon in the Philippines and described in 2019.

References

Rhynchomys
Mammals described in 2019
Rhynchomys mingan